Des Moines Christian School is a private Christian school that opened in 1948 on the campus of First Federated Church in Des Moines, Iowa, United States. In 1980, the school moved to the former Franklin Junior High School building, and in 1983 added ninth grade. In 1988, the State of Iowa granted accreditation to grades 7 through 12 (the elementary had already been accredited).

History

Conception
Des Moines Christian School was founded in June 1947 when forty-one people from various local churches in the greater Des Moines area gathered at the Des Moines YMCA to pray and consider establishing a private Christian school in the Des Moines area. It was decided to elect an evangelical school board, adopt a constitution, and formulate bylaws for a parent-inspired school.  In 2006 the school moved to its current location in Urbandale, Iowa.

Early years
In 1948, classes opened in the basement of First Federated Church with fifteen students and one teacher. In 1949, expansion to Grace Baptist Church became necessary due to a need for more space.  In 1951, both campuses consolidated and the parents decided to purchase a full city block (2.5 acres) at 62nd and Franklin Avenue and erect a school building. In September 1955, Des Moines Christian School opened its doors for the first time with approximately 135 kindergarten through eighth grade students and seven teachers.

Expansion
In August 1980, Des Moines Christian School moved to the former Franklin Junior High School building located at 48th street and Franklin Avenue, where they rented it from First Federated Church, which was also occupying part of the building.  In September 1983, Des Moines Christian added a secondary school department, which included 9th through 12 grades. In 1987, Des Moines Christian School graduated twenty-nine students in its first senior high graduation ceremony.  In January 1988, Des Moines Christian became accredited from the State of Iowa for grades 7-12 (the elementary had previously received accreditation.)  In September 1995, they received accreditation from the Association of Christian Schools International (ACSI).  In the fall of 2005, Des Moines Christian School moved out of the rented space at First Federated Church and into their own facility in Urbandale, a suburb on the west side of Des Moines.

Recent years
Starting in the 2017-18 school year, the school added a new addition, with a second gymnasium, and new rooms for the vocal and instrumental music classes. This year also introduced the split of the Secondary section into the High School and Middle School - this overhaul brought sixth grade over to the Secondary area as a mix of the elementary and the middle school. This update also moved most of the high school classrooms to the second floor and the middle school classes to the main floor.

The 2018-19 school year brought a change to the high school schedule, importing a new "flexible schedule", which uses 30 "blocks" per day to create a five-day schedule. Classes consist of various amounts of blocks per day. As of the 2019-2020 school year, the high school has moved to a six-day schedule, each with 30 "blocks". This was intended to provide students with more free time during the day, and to prepare them for what a college schedule may be like.

Today, more than 100 different churches are represented in the school's preschool through twelfth grade.  The enrollment of Des Moines Christian School is over 1200 students in grades K-12. In addition, more than 200 children are enrolled in the preschool and daycare program. The school employs more than 200 people.

Administration
Cade Lambert (Head of School)

Athletics
The Lions compete in the West Central Activities Conference in the following sports:
Volleyball
Football
Cross Country
Basketball
Track and Field
Golf 
Baseball
Softball
Soccer
Golf
Volleyball
Competition Cheer

Students at Des Moines Christian can also participate in the following sports for Urbandale:
Wrestling
Tennis
Swimming

See also
List of high schools in Iowa

References

External links
 School website

Christian schools in Iowa
Private high schools in Iowa
Schools in Des Moines, Iowa
Private middle schools in Iowa
Private elementary schools in Iowa
Educational institutions established in 1948
1948 establishments in Iowa